Machaomyia is a genus of tephritid  or fruit flies in the family Tephritidae.  It is believed to be a synonym of Acidiella.

References 

Trypetinae
Brachycera genera